Kōichirō, Koichiro, Kouichirou or Kohichiroh is a masculine Japanese given name.

Possible Writings
晃一郎, "clear, one, son"
光一郎, "light, one, son"
弘一郎, "vast, one, son"
鴻一郎, "prosperous, one, son"
紘一郎, "large, one, son"
浩一郎, "vigorous, one, son"
耕一郎, "till, one, son"
航一郎, "navigate, one, son"
倖一郎, "happiness, one, son"
孝一郎, "filial piety, one, son"
興一朗, "entertain, one, serene"
紘一朗, "large, one, serene"
こういちろう in hiragana
コウイチロウ in katakana

People
, Japanese politician
, Japanese politician
, Japanese mathematician
, Japanese sport wrestler
, Japanese manga artist
, Japanese politician
, Japanese footballer
, Japanese golfer
, Japanese mixed martial artist
, Japanese volleyball player
, Japanese diplomat
, Japanese judoka
, Japanese racewalker
, Japanese violinist and violist
, Japanese footballer
, Japanese actor
, Japanese particle physicist
 Koichiro Okuma (born 1970), Japanese instructor of Shotokan karate
, Japanese creative director
, Japanese surgeon and politician
, Japanese astronomer
, Japanese writer
, Japanese manga artist
, Japanese actor

Koichirō or Koichirou is a separate given name, though it may be romanized the same way. Notable people with the name include:
, Japanese businessman and banker
, Japanese general

Fictional characters
, a character in the tokusatsu series Megaranger
, a character in the manga series All Out!!
, a character in the anime series Aldnoah.Zero
, a character in the anime series Stratos 4
, a character in the manga series Ace of Diamond
, a character in the anime series Da-Garn
, a character in the anime series Slam Dunk
, a character in the manga series Initial D

Japanese masculine given names